Corina is a female given name of ancient Greek origin, derived from κόρη (korē) meaning "girl, maiden". Variants and diminutives include Corinna, Cori, Corri, Corinne, Corine, Kora, Korina and Korinna.

Notable people with the name Coreen, Corina or Corine include:

Coreen 
Coreen Carroll, German-American cannabis activist, chef, and writer
Coreen Grant (born 1998), Scottish rugby player
Coreen Mary Spellman (1905–1978), American painter and printmaker
Coreen Simpson (born 1942), American photographer

Corina 
Corina (American singer) or Corina Katt Ayala, American singer
Corina Abraham, Australian indigenous rights activist
Corina Apostol, Romanian art curator and writer
Corina Belcea (born 1975), Romanian classical violinist
Corina (Belgian singer) (born as Corina Braemt), Belgian female pop singer
Corina Brouder, American singer-songwriter and harpist
Corina Brussaard, Dutch Antarctic scientist
Corina (Romanian singer) or Corina Monica Ciorbă (born 1980), Romanian singer
Corina Belcea (born 1975), Romanian violinist
Corina Căprioriu (born 1986), Romanian judoka
Corina Casanova (born 1956), Swiss politician
Corina Chiriac (born 1949), Romanian singer
Corina Claudia Corduneanu (born 1988), Romanian tennis player
Corina Constantin (born 1991), Romanian aerobic gymnast
Corina Crețu (born 1967), Romanian politician
Corina Crivăț (born 1958), Romanian volleyball player
Corina del Parral (1905–1979), Argentine writer, poet, pianist, and composer
Corina Drăgan-Terecoasa (born 1971), Romanian luger
Corina Dumbrăvean (born 1984), Romanian runner
Corina Dumitrescu, Romanian politician
Corina Dumitru (born 1973), Romanian swimmer
Corina Freire (1897-c. 1975), Portuguese singer, actress, and impresario
Corina Fusu (born 1959), Moldovan politician
Corina Grünenfelder (born 1975), Swiss alpine skier
Corina Knoll, American journalist
Corina Luijks (born 1995), Dutch footballer
Corina Martín (born 1969), Argentine sprint canoer
Corina Morariu (born 1978), American tennis player
Corina Newsome, American ornithologist, birder, science communicator, and graduate student
Corina Novelino (1912–1980), Brazilian philanthropist, writer, educator, medium, and Spiritist columnist
Corina Olar (born 1984), Romanian footballer
Corina Peptan (born 1978), Romanian chess player
Corina Porro (born 1953), Spanish politician
Corina Rodríguez López (1895–1982), Costa Rican educator, writer, feminist, sculptor, suffragette, and housing activist
Corina Schröder (born 1986), German footballer
Corina Smith (born 1991), Venezuelan singer, actress, and model
Corina Ungureanu (born 1980), Romanian gymnast

Corine 
Corine Christensen (1955–1986), American murder victim
Corine Dorland (born 1973), Dutch cyclist
Corine Franco (born 1983), French footballer
Corine Hegland, American journalist
Corine Hierckens (born 1982), Belgian racing cyclist
Corine Mauch (born 1960), American-born Swiss politician
Corine Onyango (born 1984/1985), Kenyan actress and radio presenter
Corine Pelluchon (born 1967), French philosopher and professor 
Corine Rottschäfer (born 1938), Dutch model
Corine Schleif, German professor and art historian
Corine van der Zijden (born 1995), Dutch racing cyclist

See also 
 Corinna (given name)
 Corinne (name)
 Tee Corinne (1943–2006), American artist and writer
 Korine, a surname

References

Given names
Romanian feminine given names
English feminine given names
German feminine given names
French feminine given names
Moldovan feminine given names